This is a list of notable Jewish American journalists.  For other Jewish Americans, see Lists of Jewish Americans.

A through C 
 Jill Abramson (1954–), journalist and former executive editor of The New York Times
 Martin Agronsky (1915–1999), reporter and host of Agronsky & Company
 Peter Alexander (1976–), journalist
 Jonathan Alter (1957–), columnist and senior editor for Newsweek 
 David A. Andelman (1944–), journalist 
 Anne Applebaum (1964–), journalist
 Dana Bash (1971–), political correspondent at CNN
 Emily Bazelon (1971–)
 Peter Beinart (1971–), columnist, journalist, and political commentator
 John Berman (1972–), CNN
Bonnie Bernstein (1970–), sports journalist
 Carl Bernstein (1944–), investigative reporter for The Washington Post, uncovered Watergate with Bob Woodward
 Nadia Bilchik, CNN
 Wolf Blitzer (1948–), journalist and anchor for CNN
 Kate Bolduan (1983–), CNN
 Max Boot (1969–), columnist, journalist, and political commentator
 Gloria Borger (1952–), journalist at CNN
David S. Broder (1929–2011), Pulitzer Prize-winning columnist for The Washington Post
 David Brooks (1961–), columnist, The New York Times
 Ron Brownstein (1958–), senior political analyst at CNN
 Samuel Burke (1985/1986–), former anchor on CNN International and CNN en Español 
 Irin Carmon (1983/1984–), senior correspondent at New York Magazine
 Jonathan Chait, writer for New York magazine, former senior editor at The New Republic and former assistant editor of The American Prospect.
 Juju Chang (1965–), journalist at ABC News, anchor of Nightline
Mona Charen (1957–), journalist
 David Chalian (1973–), journalist and political director at CNN 
 Jean Chatzky (1964–), journalist and personal finance columnist, financial editor of NBC’s TODAY show
 Sarah Chayes (1962–), former reporter for National Public Radio
 Allan Chernoff, former senior correspondent at CNN
 Benyamin Cohen (1975–), founder of Jewsweek and American Jewish Life Magazine
 Elizabeth Cohen, journalist and senior medical correspondent for CNN
 David Corn (1959–), Washington, D.C. bureau chief for Mother Jones
 Howard Cosell (1918–1995), sports journalist, author, and lawyer best known for his tenure on ABC's Monday Night Football
 Katie Couric (1957–), journalist who currently serves as Yahoo! Global News Anchor. She has worked with all Big Three television networks in the United States, and in her early career was an Assignment Editor for CNN

D through G
 Benjamin De Casseres (1873–1945), early 20th-century journalist, critic and individualist anarchist
 Daniel Dale (1985–), CNN
 Morton Dean (1935–), CBS News reporter
 Matt Drudge (1966–), founder of the Drudge Report
 Harry Enten (1988–), senior political writer and analyst for FiveThirtyEight, senior writer and analyst for CNN Politics
 Danny Fenster (1984–), managing editor of Frontier Myanmar
 Giselle Fernández (1961–), host of Access Hollywood
 David Folkenflik (1969–), media correspondent for National Public Radio
 Max Frankel (1930–), executive editor of The New York Times
 Thomas Friedman (1953–), columnist, The New York Times
 Jamie Gangel (1955–), CNN, NBC News Bob Garfield, NPR and ABC News journalist, columnist, and author
 Brooke Gladstone (1955–), Peabody Award-winning NPR journalist and author
 Hadas Gold (1988–), CNN
 Bernard Goldberg (1945–), CBS News reporter
 Jeffrey Goldberg (1965–), journalist, staff writer for The New Yorker and author of the book Prisoners Jonah Goldberg (1969–), columnist, commentator and Senior Editor of National Review Michelle Goldberg (1975–)
 Julianna Goldman (1981–), CBS News correspondent based in Washington, D.C.
 Bianna Golodryga (1978–), journalist at CNN 
 Amy Goodman (1957–), Democracy Now! Peter Greenberg, CBS News Travel Editor
 Linda Greenhouse (1947–), Pulitzer Prize-winning reporter for The New York Times Glenn Greenwald (1967–) journalist, cofounder of The Intercept David Gregory (1970–), CNN and MSNBC
 Edwin O. Guthman (1919–2008), Pulitzer Prize-winning reporter for The Seattle Times H through M 
 Clyde Haberman (1945–)
 David Halberstam (1934–2007), Vietnam War correspondent
 Mark Halperin (1965–), Newsmax TV, ABC News, MSNBC 
 David Harsanyi (1970/1971–), National Review editor
 Seymour Hersh (1937–), investigative journalist, uncovered My Lai massacre
 Mickey Herskowitz (1933–), sportswriter and columnist for the Houston Post and the Houston Chronicle Christopher Hitchens (1949–2011), literary critic and political activistHitch-22, page 352.
 Elie Honig, senior legal analyst for CNN
 Stella Inger (1982–), journalist, CBS, ABC 
 Julia Ioffe (1982–), journalist for GQ Rebecca Jarvis (1981–), chief business, economics, and technology correspondent for ABC News
 Eliana Johnson (1984–), Washington Editor for National Review Joseph Kahn (1964–), executive editor of The New York Times Tamara Keith (1979–), NPR
 John King (1963–), CNN
 Larry King (1933–2021), RT America and former CNN host
 Ezra Klein (1984–), journalist, blogger, political commentator; co-founder and editor-at-large of Vox Beth Kobliner (1965–), personal finance commentator and journalist
 Charles Krauthammer (1950–2018), columnist and commentator for Fox News and The Washington Post Mark Leibovich (1965–), staff writer for The Atlantic Cynthia Leive (1967–), Glamour Joe Lelyveld (1937–), executive editor of The New York Times Mark Levin (1957–), lawyer, author, and radio personality
 Eric Lichtblau (1965), The New York Times, Los Angeles Times, Time magazine, The New Yorker, and CNN 
 Franz Lidz (1951–), Sports Illustrated, Smithsonian Dave Marash (1942–), former Washington-based anchor for Al Jazeera English
 Ruth Marcus (1958–), journalist
 Ari Melber (1980–), chief legal correspondent for MSNBC and host of The Beat with Ari Melber Suzy Menkes (1943–), fashion journalist
 Dana Milbank (1968–), The Washington Post Ira Victor Morris (1903–1972)

 N through R 
 Edwin Newman (1919–2010), NBC News journalist, Broadway critic, author
 David Pakman (1984–), political pundit and academic; host of the syndicated political program The David Pakman Show Pamela Paul (1970/1971–), editor of The New York Times Book Review Daniel Pearl (1963–2002), murdered foreign correspondent, The Wall Street Journal John Podhoretz (1961–), writer, editor of Commentary magazine, columnist for the New York Post, author of several books on politics
 Abigail Pogrebin (1965–), journalist for Tablet magazine
 Letty Cottin Pogrebin (1939–), founding editor of Ms. magazine
 Lynn Povich (1943–), journalist and senior editor for Newsweek Shirley Povich (1905–1998), sports columnist and reporter for The Washington Post Joshua Prager (1971–), journalist and writer for Vanity Fair, The New York Times, and The Wall Street Journal Nathan Rabin (1976–), music and pop culture journalist
 Catherine Rampell (1984–), opinion journalist and nationally syndicated opinion columnist
 David Remnick (1958–), former Moscow correspondent for The Washington Post, editor of The New Yorker Frank Rich (1949–), columnist, New York magazine
 Geraldo Rivera (1943–), investigative television journalist and host, now with Fox News
 Steven V. Roberts (1943–),  Washington pundit and U.S. News & World Report contributor
 Lester Rodney (1911–2009), journalist who helped break down the color barrier in baseball
 Hilary Rosen (1958–), The Washington Post, The Huffington Post A.M. Rosenthal (1922–2006), executive editor of The New York Times Richard Roth (1955–), CNN
 David Rothkopf (1955–), journalist
 Jennifer Rubin (1962–), columnist, The Washington Post, Commentary, PJ Media, Human Events, The Weekly Standard S through T 
 William Safire (1929–2009), columnist for The New York Times Robert J. Samuelson (1945–), columnist, The Washington Post Kasriel Hirsch Sarasohn (1835–1905), founder of Jewish Weekly, Jewish Gazette, and Jewish Daily News Michael Savage (1942–), radio host, author, and conservative political commentator
 Jessica Savitch  (1946–1983), NBC News Daniel Schorr (1916–2010), journalist who covered the world for more than 60 years, last as a senior news analyst for NPR
 Sam Seder (1966–), Air America Radio, The Majority Report George Seldes (1890–1995), World War I correspondent, post-war international reporter and media critic
 Ben Shapiro (1984–), conservative political commentator, public speaker, author, and lawyer
Jake Sherman (1985–), co-founder of Punchbowl News, journalist for NBC News, Politico, MSNBC
 David Shuster (1967–), television journalist; former anchor for MSNBC; worked for Fox News, CNN, Current TV, and Al Jazeera America
 Joel Siegel (1943–2007), film critic
 Nate Silver (1978–), writer who analyzes baseball and elections, founder and editor-in-chief of FiveThirtyEight, Special Correspondent for ABC News
 Ken Silverstein (1958–), founder of CounterPunch, writer for Harper's Magazine, Mother Jones, The Nation, Salon.com, Slate, The American Prospect and Washington Monthly Jesse Singal, writer for New York magazine, The New York Times and The Atlantic Ben Smith (1976–), media columnist at The New York Times and editor-in-chief of BuzzFeed News Jacob Soboroff (1983–), NBC News and MSNBC
 Andrew Ross Sorkin (1977–), financial columnist for The New York Times and a co-anchor of CNBC's Squawk Box Lesley Stahl (1941–), CBS reporter and correspondent for 60 Minutes
 Joel Stein (1971–), columnist, Los Angeles Times Gloria Steinem (1934–) feminist editor and writer, founder of Ms. magazine
 Bret Stephens (1973–), journalist, editor, and columnist, since April 2017 at The New York Times and June 2017 as a senior contributor to NBC News.
 Katherine Stewart, The Village Voice Eli Stokols (1978/1979–), White House reporter for the Los Angeles Times I. F. Stone (1907–1989), left-wing Washington correspondent and investigative journalist, NY Post, PM, The Nation and I.F. Stone's Weekly Jonathan Swan (1985–), political reporter for Axios Jake Tapper (1969–), CNN anchor and correspondent
 Chuck Todd  (1972–), NBC
 Katy Tur (1983–), journalist and anchor for MSNBC
 Zoey Tur (1960–), journalist
 Josh Tyrangiel (1972–), journalist, managing editor of TIME magazine, editor at Bloomberg Businessweek, managing director of Vice News U through Z 
 Chris Wallace (1947–), journalist, Fox News Mike Wallace (1918–2012), journalist, 60 Minutes correspondent
 Barbara Walters (1929–2022), media personality, a regular fixture on morning television shows (Today and The View), evening news magazines (20/20), and on The ABC Evening News, as the first female evening news anchor
Sharon Waxman (c. 1963–), journalist
 Miriam Weiner, Jewish genealogist who wrote syndicated "Roots and Branches" column that was published in 100+ Jewish newspapers and periodicals
 Bari Weiss (1984–), opinion writer and editor
 Marco Werman, radio journalist and host of PRI's The World Emily Wilder (1998/1999–), journalist at Associated Press, fired for pro-Palestinian tweets
 Walter Winchell (1897–1972), investigative broadcast journalist and gossip columnist
 Michael Wolff (1953–), journalist/columnist, USA Today, The Hollywood Reporter Gideon Yago (1978–), MTV reporter
 Robert Zelnick (1940–2019), The Christian Science Monitor, National Public Radio, Anchorage Daily News Dave Zirin (1974–), sports editor for The Nation David Zurawik (1949–), TV and media critic at The Baltimore Sun''

References 

Jewish American
Journalists
Jewish American
Jewish